Giant Springs is a large first magnitude spring located near Great Falls, Montana and is the central feature of Giant Springs State Park. According to chlorofluorocarbon dating, the water takes about 3,000 years to travel underground before returning to the surface at the springs.

Giant Springs is formed by an opening in a part of the Madison aquifer, a vast aquifer underlying 5 U.S. States and 3 Canadian Provinces. The conduit between the mountains and the spring is the geological stratum found in parts of the northwest United States called the Madison Limestone. Although some of the underground water from the Little Belt Mountains escapes to form Giant Springs, some stays underground and continues flowing, joining sources from losing streams in the Black Hills, Big Horn Mountains and other areas. The aquifer eventually surfaces in Canada.

The spring outlet is located in Giant Springs State Park, just downstream and northeast of Great Falls, Montana on the east bank of the Missouri River.  Giant Springs was first described by Lewis and Clark during their exploration of the Louisiana Purchase in 1805. Before that, the Blackfeet people utilized the springs as an easy-to-access water source in the winter. The springs were mostly ignored by settlers until 1884 when the town of Great Falls was established and the springs became the place for Sunday recreational activities. In the mid-1970s the park was established as a Montana State Park. 
 
Today, some of the spring water is bottled annually for human consumption and some of the discharge is used for a trout hatchery. The hatchery is a Montana state trout hatchery named Giant Springs Trout Hatchery and raises mostly Rainbow Trout. The spring serves as the headwaters of the -long Roe River, once listed as the shortest river in the world according to Guinness Book of World Records.  The river flows into the Missouri River which is near the spring and borders its state park.

See also
Spring (hydrosphere)

References

External links

State of Montana: Official Giant Springs State Park website
Youtube: Giant Springs 1 
Youtube: Giant Springs 2 
Youtube: Giant Springs 3

Springs of Montana
State parks of Montana
Great Falls, Montana
Landforms of Cascade County, Montana
Protected areas of Cascade County, Montana
Tourist attractions in Great Falls, Montana